Abraham Beydler House, also known as Valhalla Farm, is a historic home located near Maurertown, Shenandoah County, Virginia. It was built about 1800, and is a two-story, six room, brick dwelling in the Federal style.   It has a full basement and a two-story ell added perpendicularly to the house around 1850.  Also on the property are the contributing smokehouse and the remains of a spring house. The house is representative of German immigrant adoption of the Federal style of architecture, popular among residents of the Shenandoah Valley.

It was listed on the National Register of Historic Places in 2002.

References

German-American culture in Virginia
Houses on the National Register of Historic Places in Virginia
Federal architecture in Virginia
Houses completed in 1800
Houses in Shenandoah County, Virginia
National Register of Historic Places in Shenandoah County, Virginia